Aitor Salvador Núñez Martín (born 2 October 1987) is a Spanish former professional footballer who played as a right-back.

Club career
Núñez was born in Madrid. After starting out as a senior at local Atlético Madrid, playing two Segunda División B seasons with its reserves, he joined CD Tenerife in the summer of 2009. On 23 September of that year, he made his La Liga debut in a 1–0 home win against Athletic Bilbao, appearing in only five league matches as the Canary Islands team were eventually relegated.

After a further top-flight appearance, with Rayo Vallecano, Núñez returned to the lower leagues of his country, where he represented a host of clubs.

References

External links

1987 births
Living people
Spanish footballers
Footballers from Madrid
Association football defenders
La Liga players
Segunda División players
Segunda División B players
Segunda Federación players
Atlético Madrid B players
CD Tenerife players
Rayo Vallecano B players
Rayo Vallecano players
Cádiz CF players
CD Guadalajara (Spain) footballers
Hércules CF players
CD Eldense footballers
Cultural Leonesa footballers
CF Rayo Majadahonda players
Lleida Esportiu footballers
Internacional de Madrid players
Pontevedra CF footballers
CDA Navalcarnero players